Marti Kuusik (born on 4 July 1970) is an Estonian politician.

In April 2019, he was Minister of Foreign Trade and Information Technology. The post lasted only one day because there were alleged complaints related to domestic violence.

He has been a member of Estonian Conservative People's Party.

References

Living people
1970 births
21st-century Estonian politicians
Conservative People's Party of Estonia politicians
Government ministers of Estonia